Give a Little Love may refer to:

"Give a Little Love" (Bay City Rollers song), 1975
Give a Little Love (The Judds album), European title of the album Heartland, 1987
"Give a Little Love" (The Judds song), 1988
"Give a Little Love", by Albert Hammond and Albert West, covered by several artists
"Give a Little Love", by Andrea Faustini from Kelly
"Give a Little Love", by Golden Harvest from Golden Harvest
"Give a Little Love", by Griffin House
"Give a Little Love", by Jermaine Jackson from Precious Moments
"Give a Little Love", by LeVert from Rope a Dope Style
"Give a Little Love", by Marvin Gaye and Tammi Terrell from United
"Give a Little Love", by Mr. President
"Give a Little Love", by Noah and the Whale from Peaceful, the World Lays Me Down
"Give a Little Love", by Rilo Kiley from Under the Blacklight
"Give a Little Love", by Tom Jones
"Give a Little Love", by Ziggy Marley and the Melody Makers from Hey World!